Pondatti Pondattithan is a 1991 Tamil-language comedy drama film directed by Maniyan Sivabalan. The film stars S. Ve. Shekher and newcomer Kadambari, with Janagaraj, Senthil, Manorama, V. K. Ramasamy, Vennira Aadai Moorthy, Sulakshana, Disco Shanti and Kovai Sarala playing supporting roles. It was released on 11 July 1991. The film was a remake of Telugu film Chalaki Mogudu Chadastapu Pellam.

Plot 

Rajagopal is a bachelor office clerk who lives with his clumsy and annoying grandmother in Vellore. Rajagopal wants to get married as soon as possible with a well-educated woman. So his grandmother suggests him to marry his uneducated cousin Lakshmi, but he refuses. After seeing her, he falls under the spell of the beautiful Lakshmi. He finally marries her. Unfortunately, due to various reasons, his first night gets delayed and delayed.

A few weeks later, Rajagopal's boss Krishnan promotes Rajagopal as his assistant manager in Chennai, so Rajagopal has to leave his home for the job. There, Rajagopal lives with Jai, an old friend from his college, in a small apartment. One night, Rajagopal helps a prostitute Padma who was chased by goons and the two take refuge in a hotel. At that time, the police raid the hotel and arrest the prostitutes and their clients, the police inspector Rajendran is none other than Krishnan's friend and he immediately informs Krishnan about the matter. When Krishnan comes to the hotel, the prostitute is mistaken by Krishnan to be Rajagopal's wife and Rajendran release them. Krishnan then accommodates Rajagopal and the prostitute in his guest house. Feared of being fired from his new job, Rajagopal pays Padma for acting like his wife in front of Krishnan. What transpires next forms the rest of the story.

Cast 

S. Ve. Shekher as Rajagopal
Kadambari as Lakshmi
Janagaraj as Kathiresan
Senthil as Sabapathy
Manorama as Rajagopal's grandmother
V. K. Ramasamy as Inspector Rajendran
Vennira Aadai Moorthy as Krishnan
Sulakshana as Ramajayam
Disco Shanti as Padma
Kovai Sarala as Janaki
Y. Vijaya as Padma's sister
Kumarimuthu as Pichaimuthu
Loose Mohan as Kabali
Manager Cheena as Manager
Usilaimani as Iyer
Seenu
Venkatraman
Kumaresan
Poornima
Sumathi

Soundtrack 
The music was composed by Gangai Amaran, who also wrote the lyrics.

Reception
C. R. K. of Kalki said that in a comedy film, one should not look out for logic.

References

External links 
 

1990s Tamil-language films
1991 comedy-drama films
1991 films
Films scored by Gangai Amaran
Indian comedy-drama films
Tamil remakes of Telugu films